The Cambridge History of Political Thought is a series of history books published by Cambridge University Press covering the history of Western political thought from classical antiquity to the twentieth century.

J. G. A. Pocock has noted that the series' volume on the early modern period focuses on a specific, "coherent and idiosyncratically Latin and Western" understanding of political thought.

Contents

See also
The Foundations of Modern Political Thought

References

External links
 
 Series page on Cambridge Histories Online

Works about the history of political thought
Cambridge University Press books
Cambridge